Thomas Farren (died 26 March 1955) was an Irish Labour Party politician and trade union official. He was a member of the Stonecutters' Union of Ireland and served as the president of the Irish Trades Union Congress in 1920.

He stood unsuccessfully for a UK Parliament by-election for Dublin College Green in 1915.

He was elected to the new Irish Free State Seanad in 1922 for 9 years. He was re-elected in 1931 for another 9-year term and served until the Free State Seanad was abolished in 1936.

References

 

Year of birth missing
1955 deaths
Labour Party (Ireland) senators
Members of the 1922 Seanad
Members of the 1925 Seanad
Members of the 1928 Seanad
Members of the 1931 Seanad
Members of the 1934 Seanad
Irish trade unionists
Labour Party (Ireland) parliamentary candidates